Jan-Olof "Ove" Grahn (9 May 1943 – 11 July 2007) was a Swedish professional football player who played as a striker. He represented IF Elfsborg, Grasshoppers, Lausanne Sports, and Örgryte IS during a career that spanned between 1960 and 1978. A full international between 1962 and 1976, he won 45 caps and scored 10 goals for the Sweden national team and represented his country at the 1970 and 1974 FIFA World Cups.

Club career 
Grahn began his career with Norra Fågelås IF in Division 4, where he scored 40 goals in 14 games during the 1960 season at only 17 years of age. He then signed for IF Elfsborg in Allsvenskan and played in four games as they won the 1961 Allsvenskan title. He then went on to play professionally in Switzerland for 10 years before finishing up his career at Örgryte IS.

International career 
Between 1962 and 1976, Grahn played 45 international games for Sweden, and represented his country at the 1970 and 1974 FIFA World Cups, where he scored the winning goal against Uruguay in the former. He also represented the Sweden U19, U21, and B teams between 1961 and 1965.

Career statistics

International 

 Scores and results list Sweden's goal tally first, score column indicates score after each Grahn goal.

Honours 
Elfsborg

 Allsvenskan: 1961

Grasshoppers

 Nationalliga A: 1970–71
 Swiss League Cup: 1974–75

Individual

 Division 4 top scorer: 1960
 Stor Grabb: 1968
 Nationalliga A top scorer: 1973 (shared with Ottmar Hidzfeld)

References

External links

1943 births
2007 deaths
Association football forwards
Swedish footballers
Sweden international footballers
1970 FIFA World Cup players
1974 FIFA World Cup players
Allsvenskan players
Swiss Super League players
IF Elfsborg players
Grasshopper Club Zürich players
FC Lausanne-Sport players
Örgryte IS players
Swedish expatriate footballers
Expatriate footballers in Switzerland
Swedish expatriate sportspeople in Switzerland
People from Hjo Municipality
Sportspeople from Västra Götaland County